Stomopteryx nugatricella is a moth of the family Gelechiidae. It was described by Rebel in 1893. It is found in Spain.

References

Moths described in 1893
Stomopteryx